El-Hadj El Hachmi Guerouabi (Arabic: الهاشمي القروابي; January 6, 1938 in Boudouaou, Algeria – July 17, 2006 in Zeralda, Algeria) was an Algerian singer and composer of Chaâbi and one of the Grand Masters of the Algiers-based Chaâbi musical style.

He was born in El Mouradia (Algiers) and grew up in Bélouizdad. Two passions occupied Guerouabi's childhood: football and music. Being a good footballer he played with La Redoute AC football club until 1952. By then he had developed a special interest to music; in particular the music of El Hadj M'Hamed El Anka, Hadj M'rizek and Hssissen.

His win in the El Arbi Music-Hall contest helped him join the Opera of Algiers in 1953, where he was engaged in music but also played several theatrical roles including the famous Haroun Errachid.After the independence of Algeria from France in 1962, Guerouabi saw the invasion of foreign music, especially from Europe and Egypt, as a threat to traditional Algerian music. He tried to attract a younger audience by introducing fundamental changes in his compositions that will later make him a Master of Chaâbi. 

Guerouabi continued his innovations and became an icon of Algerian popular music. He was invited to perform on various occasions by prestigious institutions and notable individuals, which added to his popularity and respect among Chaâbi fans.

In 1987, Guerouabi went on a pilgrimage in Mecca, and gained the title of "El-Hadj". He moved to Paris (France) in the late 1990s for medical treatment for severe diabetes, where he settled until his death in 2006. Despite his illness, Guerouabi continued to produce music, play in concerts around the world, and play at weddings, but in February 2005 he underwent a surgery that resulted in the amputation of his leg and led him to quit music. However, due to a growing demand from his homeland, he gave his last concert in Algiers on July 4, 2005, in front of a very large audience. He was admitted to hospital again in July 2006, exactly one year after his last public appearance, after a heart attack which ultimately cost him his life. 
                                                                                                                                                                                                                                                                                                                                                                                                                                                                                                                                                                El Hachmi Guerouabi died on July 17, 2006, in Zeralda near Algiers and left behind him a large repertoire of music, a musical renaissance but most importantly a remarkable contribution to the Chaâbi genre.

Discography 
 Le Chaabi des Maîtres (1994)
 Succès d'hier (1995)
 Salem Maghreb (2000)
 Le grand Maître du chaabi rend hommage au pays (2002)

References

1938 births
2006 deaths
Algerian composers
People from Algiers
Algerian mondol players
21st-century Algerian people